"The Revolution Will Not Be Televised" is a poem and song by Gil Scott-Heron. Scott-Heron first recorded it for his 1970 album Small Talk at 125th and Lenox, on which he recited the lyrics, accompanied by congas and bongo drums. A re-recorded version, with a full band, was the B-side to Scott-Heron's first single, "Home Is Where the Hatred Is", from his album Pieces of a Man (1971). It was also included on his compilation album, The Revolution Will Not Be Televised (1974). All these releases were issued on the Flying Dutchman Productions record label.

The song's title was originally a popular slogan among the 1960s Black Power movements in the United States. Its lyrics either mention or allude to several television series, advertising slogans and icons of entertainment and news coverage that serve as examples of what "the revolution will not" be or do. The song is a response to the spoken-word piece "When the Revolution Comes" by The Last Poets, from their eponymous debut, which opens with the line "When the revolution comes some of us will probably catch it on TV".

It was inducted to the National Recording Registry in 2005.

In 2021, it was ranked at No. 258 on Rolling Stones "Top 500 Best Songs of All Time".

Cultural references in the poem
 "Plug in, turn on, and cop out", a reference to Timothy Leary's pro-LSD phrase "Turn on, tune in, drop out."
 "Skag", term for heroin
 "Pigs", term for police
 "Process", term for using chemicals to straighten a Black person's hair 
 Xerox, best-known manufacturer (at the time of the poem's writing) of photocopying machines
 Richard Nixon, 37th president of the United States
 John N. Mitchell, U.S. Attorney General under Nixon
 General Creighton Abrams, one of the commanders of military operations in Southeast Asia during the Vietnam War
 Mendel Rivers, chairman of the House Armed Services Committee during the period of the Vietnam War (Rivers' name appears in the original 1970 recording, but not in the re-recorded 1971 version, being replaced by Spiro Agnew)
 Spiro Agnew, 39th vice president of the United States under Nixon
 "Hog maws", sometimes misheard as "hog moss", soul food made from the stomach of a pig
 Schaefer Award Theatre, an anthology of theatrical films that aired on several U.S. TV stations
 Natalie Wood, film actress
 Steve McQueen, film actor
 Bullwinkle, cartoon character
 Julia, the lead character on the half-hour television sitcom series Julia starring Diahann Carroll.
 "Give your mouth sex appeal", from Ultra Brite toothpaste advertising
 "The revolution will not get rid of the nubs", the nubs being beard stubble, from a Gillette Techmatic razor advertisement of the period
 Willie Mays, baseball player
 "NBC will not be able to predict the winner at 8:32", a reference to television networks predicting the winner of presidential elections shortly after the polls close at 8 p.m.
 Whitney Young, civil rights leader
 Roy Wilkins, executive director of the NAACP
 Watts, a neighborhood in Los Angeles, alluding to the Watts Riots of 1965
 "Red, black, and green", the colors of the Pan-African flag
 Green Acres, a U.S. television sitcom
 The Beverly Hillbillies, a U.S. television sitcom
 "Hooterville Junction" (a corruption of Petticoat Junction, a U.S. television sitcom, and its fictitious location)
 "...will no longer be so damned relevant," a statement of approval toward the rural purge that led to the above three shows being canceled
 Dick and Jane, generic white couple derived from white children, a brother and sister, featured in American basal readers
 Search for Tomorrow, a popular U.S. television soap opera
 The Brighter Day, another U.S. television soap opera
 "Hairy-armed women liberationists", participants in second-wave feminism
 Jackie Onassis, the late U.S. President John F. Kennedy's widow, seen during the period in television broadcasts of Kennedy memorials
 Jim Webb, U.S. composer
 Francis Scott Key, lyricist of "The Star-Spangled Banner"
 Glen Campbell, U.S. pop/country music singer, then hosting The Glen Campbell Goodtime Hour
 Tom Jones, Welsh pop music singer, then hosting This Is Tom Jones
 Johnny Cash, U.S. country music singer, then hosting The Johnny Cash Show
 Engelbert Humperdinck, British pop music singer, then hosting The Engelbert Humperdinck Show
 Rare Earth, all-white U.S. pop music band signed to Motown Records (this band is only referred to in the 1971 version)
 "White tornado", advertising slogan for Ajax cleanser, "Ajax cleans like a white tornado"
 "White lightning", a term for moonshine, the name of a 1950s country and western song by George Jones, and an American psychedelic rock band.
 "Dove in your bedroom", an advertising image associated with Dove anti-perspirant deodorant
 Reference to "Put a tiger in your tank", an Esso (now Exxon) advertising slogan created by Chicago copywriter Emery Smith
 "Giant in your toilet bowl," a reference to Liquid-Plumr commercials saying that it cleared so well it was like "having a giant in your toilet bowl" with an animation of a large arm using a plunger on your toilet.
 Reference to "Things go better with Coke", a Coca-Cola advertising slogan
 Reference to "Fights germs that may cause bad breath", from Listerine advertising
 Reference to "Let Hertz put you in the driver's seat", advertising slogan for Hertz car rental

References

External links
 
 

1970 songs
African-American literature
American poems
Gil Scott-Heron songs
Jazz-funk songs
Protest songs
Songs about television
Songs about the media
Songs about revolutions
Songs about police brutality
United States National Recording Registry recordings
1970 neologisms
Quotations from music